Alien: Covenant is a 2017  science fiction action horror film directed and produced by Ridley Scott and written by John Logan and Dante Harper, from a story by Michael Green and Jack Paglen. A joint American and British production, it is a sequel to Prometheus (2012), the second entry in the Alien prequel series, and the sixth installment in the Alien franchise, three of which have been directed by Scott. It features returning star Michael Fassbender, with Katherine Waterston, Billy Crudup, Danny McBride and Demián Bichir in supporting roles. It follows the crew of a colony ship that lands on an uncharted planet and makes a terrifying discovery.

In 2012, before the release of Prometheus, Ridley Scott discussed the prospects of a sequel and new trilogy, and this film was confirmed that August. Principal photography began on April 4, 2016, at Milford Sound in Fiordland National Park, New Zealand, and wrapped on July 19, 2016. Effects houses Odd Studios and CreatureNFX provided the film's makeup and animatronic creature effects. Scott said the film's first cut was two hours and 23 minutes, which was edited down to the released version's 2 hours and 3 minutes.

Alien: Covenant premiered in London on May 4, 2017. It was released on May 12 in the United Kingdom, and on May 19 in the United States. It received generally polarized reviews from critics and underperformed at the box office; its worldwide gross was $240 million against a production budget of approximately $100 million, not including marketing costs.

Plot 

In a prologue, business magnate Peter Weyland speaks with his newly-activated android in a lakeside apartment. The android chooses the name "David" for himself after observing Michelangelo's statue. Weyland states that one day they will search for mankind's creator together. David comments on his unlimited lifespan as compared to Weyland's, which unsettles Weyland.

In 2104 AD, 11 years after the Prometheus expedition, the colonization ship Covenant is seven years from reaching planet Origae-6 with 2,000 colonists in stasis and 1,140 human embryos in cold storage. The ship is monitored by Walter, an advanced android model that physically resembles David. When a solar flare damages the ship, Walter reanimates his 14 human crewmates, who are couples and future colonists. The ship's captain, Jake Branson, is burned alive when his stasis pod malfunctions. While repairing the ship, the crew picks up a transmission of a human voice from a nearby planet which appears eminently more habitable than Origae-6. Despite the protests of Daniels, Branson's widow, that this new "perfect" planet is too good to be true, the new captain, Christopher Oram, decides they will investigate.

With pilot Tennessee maintaining Covenant in orbit, his wife Faris flies a lander to the planet's surface, where an expedition team tracks the transmission's signal to a crashed alien ship. Crewmembers Ledward and Hallett are infected by spores from fungus-like organisms. Oram's wife, Karine, helps the rapidly deteriorating Ledward back to the lander, where Faris quarantines both inside the med-bay. A small pale alien creature (neomorph) bursts from Ledward's back, killing him, and mauls Karine to death. Faris tries to kill the creature with a shotgun, but triggers an explosion that kills her and destroys the lander. Nearby in the fields, another neomorph bursts from Hallett's mouth, killing him. The creatures attack the remaining crew, killing crew member Ankor. The remaining crew kills one neomorph before David, who survived the Prometheus mission, appears and scares off the other.

David leads the crew to a temple in a city full of dead humanoids. He tells them that, upon his and fellow Prometheus survivor Elizabeth Shaw's arrival at the planet, their ship accidentally released a pathogen that annihilated all fauna on the planet, and that Shaw perished when the ship crashed. Attempts to radio the Covenant are prevented by ion storms. When the remaining neomorph infiltrates the temple and kills crewmember Rosenthal, David tries to communicate with it, and is incensed when Oram shoots it dead. Oram questions David, who reveals the aliens are a result of his releasing and experimenting with the pathogen to produce new lifeforms, before tricking Oram into being attacked by a facehugger. A new form of creature, the protomorph, later erupts from Oram's chest, killing him.

As the others search for Oram and Rosenthal, Walter finds Shaw's dissected corpse, used by David as material for his evolving creature designs. David states that humanity is a dying and unworthy species and his designed creature is a "perfect organism" that will eradicate them. When Walter disagrees, David disables him and threatens Daniels. Walter heals himself and engages David, allowing Daniels to escape.

Elsewhere, another facehugger attacks security chief Dan Lope. Crewmember Cole quickly cuts it off, leaving Lope with acid burns on his face. The now fully grown protomorph kills Cole, while Lope escapes and meets up with Daniels. Tennessee arrives in a lander to extract Daniels, Lope and Walter, who says David has "expired". They kill the attacking protomorph and return to the Covenant.

The next morning, Daniels and Tennessee discover another protomorph has burst from Lope's chest, killing him, and is loose on the Covenant. It matures and kills married crewmembers Ricks and Upworth. Daniels and Tennessee lure the creature into Covenants terraforming bay and eject it into space.

Covenant resumes its voyage to Origae-6. As Walter puts Daniels in stasis, she realizes he is actually David, but is unable to escape from her pod before falling asleep. David regurgitates two facehugger embryos, which he places in cold storage with the human embryos, and inspects the colonists. Posing as Walter, he sends a transmission in which he says all crewmembers except Daniels and Tennessee were killed by the earlier solar-flare incident.

Cast 

 
 Michael Fassbender as David 8 and Walter One, two synthetic androids. David is an older model who was a crewmember on the destroyed Prometheus, while Walter is a newer model who monitors the Covenant.
 Katherine Waterston as Daniels, the chief of terraforming for the Covenant mission and the wife/widow of the ship's captain, Jacob Branson. She is the third in command after Branson and Oram. Waterston said she was well aware of the comparisons that were going to be made between her and Sigourney Weaver's Ellen Ripley, but that she tried not to think about it too much while filming for fear of being intimidated.
 Billy Crudup as Christopher Oram, the Covenant first officer (then captain) and Karine's husband. Oram is a self-serious man of faith who believes their role on the Covenant is an act of providence, and shares a "contentious" relationship with Daniels.
 Danny McBride as Tennessee, the chief pilot of the Covenant and Maggie's husband.
 Demián Bichir as Dan Lope, the head of the security unit aboard the Covenant and Sergeant Hallett's husband.
 Carmen Ejogo as Karine Oram, the Covenant biologist and Christopher's wife.
 Jussie Smollett as Ricks, the Covenant navigator and Upworth's husband.
 Callie Hernandez as Upworth, the Covenant communications officer and Ricks' wife; she also has paramedic training.
 Amy Seimetz as Maggie Faris, the pilot of the lander and Tennessee's wife.
 Nathaniel Dean as Tom Hallett, a member of the security unit and Lope's husband.
 Alexander England as Ankor, a member of the security unit.
 Benjamin Rigby as Ledward, a member of the security unit.
 Uli Latukefu as Cole, a member of the security unit.
 Tess Haubrich as Sarah Rosenthal, a member of the security unit.

A number of actors appear in uncredited roles. Guy Pearce reprises his role as Peter Weyland, the trillionaire founder and CEO of Weyland Corporation (the Weyland-Yutani Corporation in "later" storylines) who died shortly before the destruction of the Prometheus. James Franco appears onscreen in photos and a video as Jacob Branson, the original captain of the Covenant and deceased husband of Daniels; he also appears in deleted scenes and a short promotional prologue to Covenant. Noomi Rapace, who played archaeologist Dr. Elizabeth Shaw in Prometheus, appeared in a short promotional prologue to Covenant that was set in the period between the two movies, but does not act in the final cut of the movie itself, though her voice is heard from the planet early in the film and her image and voice appear later.

Other credited parts include Lorelei King as the voice of the Covenant computer "Mother". Goran D. Kleut is credited in two roles, as both a neomorph and a protomorph, while Andrew Crawford is credited as a neomorph.

Production

Development 
Alien: Covenant is the second film in the Alien prequel series, and the sixth installment in the Alien franchise . It is the third Alien film to be directed by Ridley Scott. In 2012, prior to the release of the first prequel (the fifth Alien film overall), Prometheus, director Ridley Scott began hinting at the prospect of a sequel, as Prometheus had left many questions unanswered. He said a sequel would follow Shaw, the protagonist of Prometheus, to her next destination, "because if it is paradise, paradise cannot be what you think it is. Paradise has a connotation of being extremely sinister and ominous." Prometheus co-writer Damon Lindelof cast doubt on his own participation, saying, "if [Scott] wants me to be involved in something, that would be hard to say no to. At the same time, I do feel like the movie might benefit from a fresh voice or a fresh take or a fresh thought." In June, Scott said an additional film would be required to bridge the >100-year gap between the Prometheus sequel and Alien.

, Fox was pursuing a sequel with Scott, Noomi Rapace, and Michael Fassbender involved, and talking to new writers in case Lindelof did not return. In December 2012, Lindelof ultimately chose not to work on the project. Early on, Scott stated the film would feature no xenomorphs as he wanted to phase the xenomorph out to focus on David 8, whose A.I. was the new alien lifeform. He later made statements confirming the xenomorph's presence in the film, mainly due to feedback to Prometheus.

On September 24, 2015, Scott disclosed the film's title as Alien: Paradise Lost. In November 2015, he revealed the new title was Alien: Covenant, and that filming would begin in February 2016 in Australia. An official logo, synopsis and release date were released on November 16, 2015. In an interview about the development of the David character since Prometheus, Scott described the dark turn David would take in Covenant: "'He hates them. He has no respect for Engineers and no respect for human beings.'"

Writing 

The initial screenplay was written by Transcendence screenwriter Jack Paglen in June 2013. In March 2014, Michael Green was hired to rewrite Paglen's script. Dante Harper later wrote a new script, but an extensive rewrite was performed by screenwriter John Logan. Logan had previously worked with Scott on Gladiator.

For Logan, the main concept was to adopt a dual plot line for the film that would combine the horror elements of Alien with the philosophical elements of Prometheus. He said, "With Alien: Covenant, I just really wanted to write something that had the feel of the original Alien, because seeing that movie was one of the great events of my youth. It was so overpowering in terms of what it communicated to me and its implications, that when I started talking to Ridley about what became Alien: Covenant, I said, 'You know, that was a hell of a scary movie.' I wanted to write a horror movie because the Grand Guignol elements of Alien are so profound. We tried to recapture that with Alien: Covenant, while also trying to pay homage to the deeper implications of Prometheus. In terms of tone, pace, and how we chose to play this particular symphony, we wanted to create a really frightening movie."

Pre-production 
In late August 2015, Scott confirmed that he had started scouting locations for the film. In October 2015, the Australian government attracted the production of this film, and of Thor: Ragnarok, to Australia by providing AU$47.25 million in grants. Woz Productions Ltd., a subsidiary of 20th Century Fox, visited Te Anau, New Zealand, on March 28, 2016, to scout locations for filming in Fiordland.

Casting 
In August 2015, it was announced that the film would star Rapace and Fassbender, while Rik Barnett was in talks to join the cast. That December, Katherine Waterston was cast in the lead role of Daniels; it was Waterston's second film alongside Fassbender, after Steve Jobs. Summer Glau, Carolyn Murphy and Alice Eve were also being considered. Dariusz Wolski, longtime collaborator with Scott, was confirmed to serve as the film's cinematographer. In 2016, Ridley Scott stated that Noomi Rapace would not reprise her role of Elizabeth Shaw. However, in June, it was announced that Rapace would shoot a week's worth of scenes (though no new footage of hers appeared in the final film). Creature designer Carlos Huantes said in a 2019 interview that he believed it was the studio's decision to remove her from the film.

In February 2016, Danny McBride, Demián Bichir, Jussie Smollett, Amy Seimetz, Carmen Ejogo, Callie Hernandez, Billy Crudup, and Alexander England were reported to have joined the cast. In March 2016, newcomer Benjamin Rigby also joined the cast. In December 2016, it was announced James Franco had been cast in the role of Captain Branson, husband to Daniels and captain of the Covenant. The role of Branson in the film was limited to a cameo appearance of the deceased captain.

Production design 
Adam Savage went on a tour of several of the props and stage sets used in the filming which included an alien spaceship which had first appeared in Prometheus. This set had to be recreated for Alien: Covenant as the set used in Prometheus had been destroyed. In an article for The Hollywood Reporter, Patrick Shanley interviewed the art director for the film, Damien Drew, and creature design supervisor Conor O'Sullivan regarding the involvement of the San Diego Zoo and its representative Rick Schwartz as a consultant for the design of the realistic effects of the creatures and Xenomorphs appearing throughout the film as Scott wanted a more 'organic' feeling to the creatures as opposed to the 'biomechanical' inspiration of H.R. Giger which had inspired the creature designs in the original films. Scott provided anatomical studies and references from La Specola, a natural history museum in Florence, to O'Sullivan as inspiration.

The VFX supervisor Charles Henley summarized the several vendors that were used to support production of the visual special effects seen in the film when the selection process was discussed, stating, "Both history and need guided the decisions on which vendors we used. Ridley had worked with MPC on many previous projects, in particular Prometheus for which I was MPC's VFX supervisor as well as The Martian. There had a been a lot of great digital double and creature work done at MPC on recent projects so there was confidence they should be the lead facility. Framestore had recently worked with Ridley on space for The Martian, similarly Animal Logic now had the original crew who did the holograms for Prometheus. Also as we were shooting in Australia there was good reason and incentives to use Australian-based companies and so Luma and Rising Sun came on board."

Filming 

Principal photography for the film began on April 4, 2016, at Milford Sound in Fiordland National Park, New Zealand, and wrapped on July 19, 2016. Some footage was also filmed at Leavesden Studios in England, which included reshoots. The complete list of countries used for filming were listed by BFI in Sight & Sound as the United Kingdom, United States, Australia, and New Zealand. Previous partial lists often listed only one of the four countries involved in the development and production of the film.

Effects houses Odd Studios and CreatureNFX provided the film's makeup and animatronic creature effects, respectively, while Australian-based effects house Animal Logic provided the film's digital visual effects. Approximately 30 people from CreatureNFX worked on the project for almost six months building animatronics. Actors wearing creature suits with animatronic heads were used to portray the aliens on-set.

Post-production 
Pietro Scalia, the editor of the film, spoke of the structural difficulty of integrating the two story lines in the final editing of the film and how the need to keep momentum was important. He did this by not repeatedly jumping between scenes which he said made parts of the film "belaboured and tedious", as well as combining certain scenes and eliminating others. Another issue highlighted was the reveal of David as;

 

Scott said the first cut of the film was two hours and 23 minutes long, which was eventually edited down to 2 hours and 3 minutes for the released version. Scott used test screenings to decide what to cut.

Music 

The musical score for Alien: Covenant was written by Australian musician and composer Jed Kurzel. Initially, Harry Gregson-Williams was selected as the film's composer. When the first trailer was released in late 2016, Kurzel was revealed as the replacement for Gregson-Williams. Themes from Jerry Goldsmith's original score for Alien were incorporated, as well as themes from Marc Streitenfeld's and Harry Gregson-Williams' score for Prometheus. A version of "Nature Boy" sung by Norwegian singer and songwriter Aurora was used in the first trailer, while another song, "Under the Water", was used in a short  promotional film featuring the character Daniels (Katherine Waterston) battling a xenomorph.

Melanie De Biasio's track "I Feel You – Eels Remix" was used as the soundtrack for the in-universe short film Meet Walter, starring Michael Fassbender, that was created to promote the film.

Additional song credits include "Theme from Alien" composed by Jerry Goldsmith, "Das Rheingold, Scene 4: Entrance of the Gods into Valhalla" composed by Richard Wagner, "Take Me Home, Country Roads" by John Denver, "The Man Who Broke the Bank at Monte Carlo" by Fred Gilbert, "Ancient Flute", "Life" and "We Were Right" composed by Harry Gregson-Williams, and "Let Me Down Easy" by Paolo Nutini.

Release 
In the run up to release, 20th Century Fox released a number of short prologue films as part of the marketing for Alien: Covenant. The first, called Prologue: Last Supper, was directed by Ridley Scott's son Luke Scott and features the crew of the Covenant having a last meal before they enter cryosleep. The second prologue, called The Crossing and directed by Ridley Scott, reveals what happened to Elizabeth Shaw (Noomi Rapace) and the android David (Michael Fassbender) following the ending of Prometheus. Another was called Meet Walter, starring Michael Fassbender and directed by Luke Scott, which was a fictional advertisement for the Walter series of androids.

Alien: Covenant premiered on May 4, 2017, at the Odeon Leicester Square in London. The film was released on May 19 in the United States, in 2D and IMAX 2D. It was originally set to be released on October 6, 2017, before being moved up to August 4, and then again to its final date.

The version of the film released in China on June 16, 2017, was six minutes shorter than the version released elsewhere due to censorship with most of the scenes involving the aliens and a scene where the two characters played by Michael Fassbender kiss having been cut.

The film was released in Japan on September 15, 2017.

The Blu-ray, DVD, and 4K Ultra HD releases of the film came out on August 15, 2017. The home release includes an audio commentary by the director and 22 minutes of deleted scenes and unused footage from the first cut of the film.

Adaptations

Novelization 
The theatrical release of the film was accompanied by the release of a novelization by Alan Dean Foster, who also authored the novelization of the original Alien film. A companion volume about the film's art and stage design was released at the same time, written by Simon Ward and titled The Art and Making of Alien: Covenant.

A second Covenant novel by Foster was initially billed as a sequel to the film, before being revealed to be a direct prequel to Covenant under the title Alien: Covenant – Origins. Titan Books, as publisher of the book, released a plot summary in advance of its release on September 26, 2017:

Virtual Reality 
On April 26, 2017, 20th Century Fox released Alien: Covenant In Utero, a virtual reality interactive demo teaser for Alien: Covenant for the Oculus Rift and the Samsung Gear VR. The experience was produced by RSA, FoxNext VR, MPC, Mach1, AMD Radeon, and Dell Alienware. The trailer is a first-person experience in which the viewer plays the role of a neomorph. The experience was executive produced by Scott and directed by David Karlak.

Reception

Box office 
Alien: Covenant underperformed at the box office grossing a worldwide total of $240.9 million, including $74.3 million in the United States and Canada and $166.6 million in other countries, against a production budget of $97 million, not including marketing costs. The film was a box office disappointment for the studio, especially when compared to Prometheus which had grossed a worldwide total of $403.4 million.

Fox released the film in several countries before the United States. It was released in 34 markets, where it debuted to $40.1 million, opening at number one in 19 of them. Its overall rank for the weekend was second behind the continued run of Guardians of the Galaxy Vol. 2. The top openings were in South Korea ($7.2 million), the UK ($6.4 million), France ($4.5 million), Australia ($3.1 million), and Mexico ($2.5 million). In China, the film was released on June 16 and grossed $30 million, topping the box office.

In North America, the film was released alongside Everything, Everything and Diary of a Wimpy Kid: The Long Haul, and was projected to gross around $40 million from 3,760 theaters during its opening weekend. 

It made $4.3 million from Thursday-night previews at about 3,000 theaters, and $15.4 million overall on its first day, which was below the $21.5 million Friday of Prometheus five years prior. It went on to open to $36.2 million, down 34% from Prometheuss debut, but still finishing first at the box office, as the third-highest debut of the series when not counting for inflation. In its second weekend, the film grossed $10.5 million, finishing fourth at the box office and dropping 70.9%. The film was pulled from 1,112 theaters in its third weekend and dropped another 62.3%, finishing sixth at the box office with $4 million.

Critical response 

Alien: Covenant received generally positive reviews from critics. The website's critical consensus reads, "Alien: Covenant delivers another satisfying round of close-quarters deep-space terror, even if it doesn't take the saga in any new directions." On Metacritic, the film has a score of 65 out of 100, based on reviews from 52 critics, indicating "generally favorable reviews". Audiences polled by CinemaScore gave the film an average grade of "B" on an A+ to F scale, the same score earned by its predecessor.

Writing for The Guardian, Peter Bradshaw gave the film three stars out of five, stating that Alien: Covenant is "a greatest-hits compilation of the other Alien films' freaky moments. The paradox is that though you are intended to recognise these touches, you won't really be impressed unless you happen to be seeing them for the first time. For all this, the film is very capably made, with forceful, potent performances from Waterston and Fassbender." Geoffrey McNab, writing for The Independent, stated that it "certainly delivers what you'd expect from an Aliens film—spectacle, body horror, strong Ripley-like female protagonists and some astonishing special effects—but there's also a dispiriting sense that the film isn't at all sure of its own identity." He found the screenplay "very portentous" and concluded that "the crew members pitted against the monstrous creatures are trying their darndest to blast them to kingdom come, just as they would in any run-of-the-mill sci-fi B movie."

A. O. Scott of The New York Times said, "Alien: Covenant is an interesting movie ... for all its interplanetary ranging, [it] commits itself above all to the canny management of expectations." Trace Thurman, from Bloody Disgusting, gave the film a mediocre review, noting that although watching Alien: Covenant will make viewers appreciate Prometheus more, "this is a film that was made as a response to Prometheus critics but tries to appease fans of that film as well and it doesn't fully work." He also criticizes the overfamiliarity of the climax and insufficiently developed characters. Collider's review of the film stated that Scott "finds himself stuck between two constructs—the action-horror beats of an Alien film, and the weighty, ponderous themes of a Prometheus movie—and by indulging both, he never fully satisfies either. The result is a messy film that is at turns, exquisite and infuriating."

In a review for The Independent Clarisse Loughrey gave the film five stars describing it as "relentless and overwhelming, but all in the very best of ways" and as a "mightily impressive piece of cinematic engineering" which has brought together the Alien franchise. Loughrey praised Katherine Waterston for her "impressive work" as Daniels and went on to single out Fassbender for playing a "deeply frightening, scene-stealing antagonist". Sinead Brennan for RTÉ, gave the film 7/10, but gave high praise to Fassbender who she says "steals the show; seriously, he's incredible". Meanwhile, Neil Soans in a three star review for The Times of India, highlighted Danny McBride's performance as the most surprising given his comedic roots.

Matt Zoller Seitz of RogerEbert.com highly praised Alien: Covenant, giving it four out of four stars and stating that the film's structure, although repeatedly borrowing from other Alien films, serves a purpose not unlike the James Bond film series or Star Wars, "where part of the fun lies in seeing what variations the artists can bring while satisfying a rigid structure." He also emphasized that, like previous films of the series, real-world logic should not be applied to the film, and "[i]nstead you have to judge it by the standards of a fever dream or nightmare, a Freudian-Jungian narrative where the thing you fear most is what happens to you." Seitz later voted for it in Sight & Sound as one of the five best films of 2017.

In New York magazine, David Edelstein commented on David the android as representing a new generation of monster villains in the tradition of Frankenstein, stating, "In Star Trek, that man-machine nexus was...hopeful. Here, there's some doubt about David's ultimate motives, which puts Alien: Covenant squarely in the tradition of the Terminator and Matrix movies. And, of course, the novel Frankenstein, which carried the subtitle The Modern Prometheus. No less than Stephen Hawking—who survived with the aid of machines—has predicted that we have 100 years to live before evolved machines take human imperfection as justification for destroying humanity".

Kevin Lincoln, writing for Vulture, gave a strong endorsement of the depiction of David as an arch-villain in the film stating, "...one franchise is showing it's still possible for a modern blockbuster to have a great villain. In Alien: Covenant, David—the android played by Michael Fassbender, first introduced in Prometheus—comes into his own as a fleshed-out, dynamic, and genuinely striking antagonist, one who isn't just an equal match for the heroes, but even becomes the central thread of the series. He's a huge part of what makes Alien: Covenant work."

Writing for Vox, Alissa Wilkinson said that "Alien: Covenant is too muddled to pull off its deeply ambitious Satan allegories". She emphasized the Miltonic demonic aspect of the android David: "But David is a better Satan than Satan himself ... It's as if in the Alien universe, the devil has evolved, thanks to humans creating him. David, fatally, has the ability to create—something Satan never had—and he will use that power only to destroy. He doesn't have any real need to rebel against his maker, since from the moment he became sentient, he knew he'd already won. He is indestructible, and determined to make creatures that imitate his drive for total domination."

Accolades 

At the 44th Saturn Awards, the film was nominated for Best Science Fiction Film, but lost to Blade Runner 2049, another film by Scott Free Productions (and of which Ridley Scott was an executive producer).

Sequel 

In September 2015, Ridley Scott said he was planning two sequels to Prometheus that would lead into the first Alien film, adding, "Maybe [there will] even [be] a fourth film before we get back into the Alien franchise". Scott later confirmed in November that Alien: Covenant would be the first of three additional films in the Alien prequel series before linking up with the original Alien, and stated that the Prometheus sequels would reveal who created the xenomorph aliens. The screenplay for the third prequel film was written during production of Alien: Covenant and finished in 2017, with production originally scheduled to begin in 2018. In March 2017, Scott said, "If you really want a franchise, I can keep cranking it for another six. I'm not going to close it down again. No way."

Scott responded to a question about Sigourney Weaver reprising her role as Ellen Ripley in the prequels that, "Well, we're heading toward the back end of the first Alien so [using CGI] may be feasible. Ripley's going to be somebody's daughter, obviously. We're coming in from the back end. The time constraints of what's the time between this film, where we leave David going off heading for that colony, I think you're probably two films out from even considering her." In the audio commentary for Alien: Covenant, Scott confirmed that a sequel to Alien: Covenant, tentatively referred to as "Alien: Covenant 2", is being written by John Logan, with Fassbender, Waterston, and McBride reprising their roles. Scott also confirmed that the film will complete his prequel series, leading directly into the events of Alien.

In September 2017, the chief executive officer of 20th Century Fox, Stacey Snider, stated that, although Alien: Covenant was a financial disappointment, the studio still intended to proceed with Scott's sequel. Just days later, screen-graphics designer Carl Braga announced that the project had been delayed.

In October, Scott stated that "Alien: Covenant 2" will focus more on the androids and A.I.s, as opposed to the xenomorphs. He said, "I think the evolution of the Alien himself is nearly over, but what I was trying to do was transcend and move to another story, which would be taken over by A.I.s. The world that the A.I. might create as a leader if he finds himself on a new planet. We have actually quite a big layout for the next one." In November 2018, the film's plot details were reported to take place on LV-426 (the world visited by the Nostromo in the original Alien film), with the extraterrestrial Engineers being featured in the film and being in pursuit of David following his nefarious actions against Planet 4.

At the 2019 CinemaCon, it was stated that, after its acquisition of 21st Century Fox, Disney "will continue to create new stories" in the Alien series. In May, Variety reported that another prequel was reportedly "in the script phase", with Ridley Scott attached to direct, but it was still uncertain due to the poor box office returns of Alien: Covenant. In September 2020, Scott confirmed that a new Alien film was in development but it was unclear if this would be a sequel to Alien: Covenant. In August 2021, however, a news report concluded that a sequel is currently uncertain. 

20th Century Studios announced in March 2023 that a new Alien film would begin production the same month.

See also 
 List of films featuring extraterrestrials

Notes

References

External links 

 
 
 
 
 
 
 

2017 films
2010s action horror films
2017 horror films
2010s adventure films
2010s science fiction horror films
2017 science fiction action films
2010s monster movies
20th Century Fox films
Alien (franchise) films
American action horror films
American science fiction action films
American science fiction adventure films
American science fiction horror films
American sequel films
American space adventure films
Android (robot) films
Brandywine Productions films
British action horror films
British science fiction adventure films
British science fiction action films
British science fiction horror films
British space adventure films
2010s English-language films
Films about ancient astronauts
Films about artificial intelligence
Films about extraterrestrial life
Films directed by Ridley Scott
Films produced by Walter Hill
Films scored by Jed Kurzel
Films set on fictional planets
Films set in 2094
Films set in 2104
Films set on spacecraft
Films shot at Warner Bros. Studios, Leavesden
Films shot in New Zealand
Films shot in Sydney
Films with screenplays by John Logan
IMAX films
Interquel films
Prequel films
Interstellar travel in fiction
Mythology in popular culture
Scott Free Productions films
TSG Entertainment films
2010s American films
2010s British films
American prequel films